Jacques de Champlain, OC (13 March 1938 - 15 July 2009) was a scientist, doctor and professor from the Province of Quebec.

Jacques de Champlain was a graduate of the Université de Montréal and McGill University and a pioneer in research on the nervous system. He was also a member of the Royal Society of Canada, an Officer of the Order of Canada and an Officer of the Ordre national du Québec. He was a research professor in the Departments of Physiology and Medicine at the Université de Montréal. De Champlain died of a heart attack.

References

1938 births
2009 deaths
Canadian medical researchers
Fellows of the Royal Society of Canada
Université de Montréal alumni
McGill University alumni
Physicians from Montreal
Scientists from Montreal
20th-century Canadian scientists
21st-century Canadian scientists
Academics from Montreal
Officers of the Order of Canada